Frank Perry is an English translator from Brighton, Sussex.

He has translated many of Sweden's leading playwrights, poets and novelists. His work has won the Swedish Academy Prize for the introduction of Swedish literature abroad, the prize of the Writer’s Guild of Sweden for drama translation and in 2017 his translation of Lina Wolff’s Bret Easton Ellis and the Other Dogs was awarded the prestigious Oxford-Weidenfeld Translation Prize. From 2016 viewers have been watching his English-language versions of Hans Rosenfeldt’s scripts for the award-winning ITV series Marcella – with another series to come in 2019.

Published in 2018 were Perry’s translations of Caterina Pascual Söderbaum’s literary masterpiece The Oblique Place, Axel Lidén’s On Sheep: Diary of a Swedish Shepherd and Hans Hayden’s Modernism as Institution. He was awarded the triennial Bernard Shaw Prize in 2019 for best literary translation from Swedish.

References 

Year of birth missing (living people)
Living people
English translators